The Power Broker: Robert Moses and the Fall of New York is a 1974 biography of Robert Moses by Robert Caro. The book focuses on the creation and use of power in New York local and state politics, as witnessed through Moses' use of unelected positions to design and implement dozens of highways and bridges, sometimes at great cost to the communities he nominally served. It has been repeatedly named one of the best biographies of the 20th century, and has been highly influential on city planners and politicians throughout the United States. The book won a Pulitzer Prize in 1975.

Synopsis 

The Power Broker traces Moses' life from his childhood in Connecticut to his early years as an idealistic advocate for Progressive reform of the city's corrupt civil service system. According to Caro, Moses' failures there, and later experience working for future New York Mayor Jimmy Walker in the State Senate and Governor of New York Al Smith taught him how to acquire and wield power in order to achieve his goals.

By the 1930s, Moses had earned a reputation as a creator of public parks in both the city and state, and later long-sought projects like the Triborough Bridge (later renamed Robert F. Kennedy Bridge), but at the price of his earlier integrity by circumventing and creation of sources of political power, as seen in his work in the creation and expansion of New York's public authorities. Caro ultimately portrays Moses as an appointed bureaucrat who, through his reputation for getting large construction projects done, amassed so much power over the years that the many elected officials whom he supposedly reported to instead became dependent on him. He consistently favored automobile traffic over mass transit and human and community needs. While bragging that he served in his many public jobs (save as New York City Parks Commissioner) without compensation, he lived like a king and similarly enriched those individuals in public and private life who aided him.

Caro pays ample tribute to Moses for his intelligence, political shrewdness, eloquence and hands-on, if somewhat aggressive, management style, and gives full credit for his earlier achievements, but he has an ambivalent view of the man.

The book is 1,336 pages long (only two-thirds of the original manuscript), and provides documentation of its assertions in most instances, which Moses and his supporters attempted to refute.

Origins 
As a reporter for Newsday in the early 1960s, Caro wrote a long series about why a proposed bridge across Long Island Sound from Rye to Oyster Bay, championed by Moses, would have been inadvisable. It would have required piers so large as to disrupt tidal flows in the sound, among other problems. Caro believed that his work had influenced even the state's powerful governor Nelson Rockefeller to reconsider the idea, until he saw the state's Assembly vote overwhelmingly to pass a preliminary measure for the bridge.

"That was one of the transformational moments of my life," Caro said years later. It led him to think about Moses for the first time. "I got in the car and drove home to Long Island, and I kept thinking to myself: 'Everything you've been doing is baloney. You've been writing under the belief that power in a democracy comes from the ballot box. But here's a guy who has never been elected to anything, who has enough power to turn the entire state around, and you don't have the slightest idea how he got it.'"

In 1966, his wife Ina Caro changed the topic of her graduate thesis to write about the Verrazzano-Narrows Bridge, while Caro was a Nieman Fellow at Harvard University taking courses in urban planning and land use. He found that academics' notions of highway planning contrasted with what he had seen as a reporter. "Here were these mathematical formulas about traffic density and population density and so on," he recalled, "and all of a sudden I said to myself: 'This is completely wrong. This isn't why highways get built. Highways get built because Robert Moses wants them built there. If you don't find out and explain to people where Robert Moses gets his power, then everything else you do is going to be dishonest.'"

He found that despite Moses' illustrious career, no biography had been written, save the highly propagandistic Builder for Democracy in 1952. So he decided to undertake the task himself, beginning the seven-year process of hundreds of interviews meticulously documented as well as extensive original archival research, listed in the notes on sources in an appendix.

Originally, Caro believed it would take nine months to research and write the book. As that time stretched into years, he ran out of money and despaired of ever finishing it. Ina, his wife and research assistant, sold the family home on Long Island and moved the Caros to an apartment in the Bronx where she had taken a teaching job, so that her husband could continue.

Moses "did his best to try to keep this book from being written—as he had done, successfully, with so many previous, stillborn, biographies." After Caro had been working on the book for more than a year, Moses agreed to sit for a series of seven interviews, one lasting from 9:30 A.M. until evening, providing much material about his early life, but when Caro began asking questions ("for having interviewed others involved in the subjects in question and having examined the records—many of them secret—dealing with them, it was necessary to reconcile the sometimes striking disparity between what he told me and what they told me") the series of interviews was abruptly terminated."

Caro's final manuscript ran to about 1,050,000 words. Editor Robert Gottlieb told him that the maximum possible length of a trade book was about 700,000 words, or 1,280 pages. When Caro asked about splitting the book into two volumes, Gottlieb replied that he "might get people interested in Robert Moses once. I could never get them interested in him twice." So Caro had to cut down his manuscript, which took him months.

Reception 
The Power Broker generated substantial public discussion upon publication, especially after the "One Mile" chapter ran as an excerpt in The New Yorker. The chapter highlighted the difficulties in constructing one section of the Cross-Bronx Expressway and the way Moses ran roughshod over the interests of residents and businesses of the section of East Tremont which the road effectively destroyed. Before publication, Caro, largely unknown at the time, challenged the magazine's legendary editor, William Shawn, over his changes to Caro's prose. It was common for the magazine to edit excerpts to conform to its house style. This did not make allowance for many of the author's narrative flourishes, such as single-sentence paragraphs. Caro also complained that much of his work had been compressed.

The book won the Pulitzer Prize for Biography or Autobiography in 1974, as well as the Francis Parkman Prize awarded by the Society of American Historians to the book that best "exemplifies the union of the historian and the artist." On June 12, 1975, The New York Chapter of the American Institute of Architects conferred a "Special Citation upon Robert Caro ... for reminding us once again, that ends and means are inseparable." In 1986, it was recognized by the American Academy and Institute of Arts and Letters, and in 2001 the Modern Library selected it as one of the hundred most important books of the 20th century. In 2005, Caro was awarded the Gold Medal in Biography from the American Academy of Arts and Letters. In 2010, President Barack Obama, after awarding Caro a National Humanities Medal, said "I think about Robert Caro and reading The Power Broker back when I was 22 years old and just being mesmerized, and I'm sure it helped to shape how I think about politics." In 2010, Caro was inducted into the New York State Writers Hall of Fame. David Klatell, former interim dean of the Columbia University Graduate School of Journalism, recommended the book to new students to familiarize themselves with New York City and the techniques of investigative reporting.

Response from Moses 
Moses and his supporters considered the book to be overwhelmingly biased against him, and what his supporters considered to be a record of unprecedented accomplishment. Moses put out a 23-page typed statement challenging some of its assertions (he claimed he never used the anti-Italian slurs the book attributes to him about Fiorello La Guardia, for instance).

Modern re-assessment 
In later years a more positive view of Moses' career has emerged, in explicit reaction to his portrayal in The Power Broker. This re-evaluation has included museum exhibits and a 2007 book (Robert Moses and the Modern City) described as having a "revisionist theme running throughout". In 2014, the author reminisced about his seven years' labor on the book in The New York Times Sunday Book Review.

The book remains highly regarded. In 2017, David W. Dunlap described The Power Broker as "the book that still must be read – 43 years after it was published – to understand how New York really works." In 2020, the book made frequent appearances as the "ultimate signifier of New York political sophistication" on the bookshelves of U.S. journalists and politicians appearing in TV interviews from their homes during the COVID-19 pandemic.

In the book Caro claims Moses made parkway bridges low to keep buses from bringing black people to the beaches.  In 1999 German professor of sociology Bernward Joerges, pointed out that buses were not allowed on the parkway anyway and "Moses did nothing different on Long Island from any parks commissioner in the country" in designing bridges too low for buses to pass under.

See also

 History of New York City

References

External links
 
 Caro's retrospective New Yorker article on the writing of the book (1998)
WNYC conversation with Caro about the book on the 40th anniversary of its publication (2014)
Presentation by Caro on "New York Politics In The Mid 1900's", February 18, 1998, C-SPAN
Presentation by Caro on The Power Broker, September 28, 1998, C-SPAN
Presentation by Caro on The Power Broker, February 11, 2007, C-SPAN

1974 non-fiction books
Alfred A. Knopf books
American biographies
Books about urbanism
Books about New York City
Books with cover art by Paul Bacon
History of New York City
Pulitzer Prize for Biography or Autobiography-winning works
Urban planning in New York City